Robinson is an English language patronymic surname, originating in England. It means "son of Robin (a diminutive of Robert)". There are similar surname spellings such as Robison and Robeson. Robinson is the 15th-most common surname in the United Kingdom. According to the 1990 United States Census, Robinson was the twentieth most frequently encountered surname among those reported, accounting for 0.23% of the population.

In Ireland, Robinson is most common in Ulster. The two names had been used interchangeably in some areas of the province around the beginning of the 20th century.

Robinson, the compound word, is a rare given name, while its derivative, Robin, has the distinction of being both a masculine and feminine given name.

Given name
Robinson Canó (born 1982), Dominican professional baseball player
Robinson Crusoe, fictional eponymous hero of Daniel Defoe's novel
 Robinson Duckworth (1834–1934), British priest and clergyman
Robinson Jeffers (1887–1962), American poet
Robinson Leyer (born 1993), Dominican professional baseball player
Robinson Merchán (born 1974), Venezuelan road cyclist
Robinson Odoch (born 1989), Ugandan basketball player
Robinsón Pitalúa (1964–1985), Colombian boxer

Surname

A–D
Aaron Robinson (disambiguation), multiple people
Abraham Robinson (1918–1974), German-American mathematician
Adrian Robinson (1989-2015), American football linebacker
Adrian Robinson (born 2000), Botswana swimmer
Adrian Henry Wardle Robinson (1925–2018) British geographer
Adrien Robinson (born 1988), American football player
Alastair Robinson, British botanist
Alastair Robinson (rugby union) (born 1956), New Zealand rugby union player
Albert William Robinson (1877–1943), Australian parliamentarian
Alexander "Buck Alec" Robinson (–1995), Irish boxer, loyalist paramilitary and Ulster Special Constabulary reservist
Allen Robinson (born 1993), American football player
Alton Robinson (born 1998), American football player
Alvin Robinson (musician) (1937–1989), American R&B singer, songwriter and guitarist
Amy Robinson (born 1948), American actress and film producer
Amy Robinson (athlete), New Zealand field hockey and volleyball player
Andrew Robinson (disambiguation), multiple people, includes Andy Robinson
Angus Hargreaves Robinson (1907–1973), Australian grazier and ornithologist
Anna Lynch-Robinson, costume designer
Anne Robinson (born 1944), British television presenter and journalist, host of The Weakest Link
Annot Robinson, née Wilkie, nicknamed Annie, (1874–1925), British pacifist and suffragette
Anthony Charles Robinson (born 1952), English business speaker, author and micro-enterprise campaigner
Arnie Robinson (1948–2020), American athletics long jumper
Arthur Robinson (disambiguation), multiple people
A. N. R. Robinson (1926–2014), the President (1997–2003) and Prime Minister (1986–1991) of Trinidad and Tobago
Barbara Robinson (author) (1927–2013), American children's writer
 Basil Robinson (RAF officer) (1912–1943), British pilot with RAF Bomber Command during World War II
 Basil Robinson (cricketer) (1919–2012), Canadian cricketer
 Basil William Robinson, British art scholar and author
Benjamin Lincoln Robinson (1864–1935), American botanist
Bernadette Robinson, Australian stage actress
Bertram Fletcher Robinson (1870–1907), British journalist, editor, author and sportsperson
Beth Robinson, member of the Supreme Court of Vermont
Betty Robinson (1911–1999), American sprinter, winner of the first Olympic 100m for women
Bijan Robinson (born 2002), American football player
Bill Robinson (author) (1918–2007), American editor, author and sailor
Bishop Robinson (disambiguation), multiple people
Bo Robinson (born 1956), American football player
Brian Robinson (disambiguation), multiple people
Brooks Robinson (born 1937), American baseball player
Bruce Robinson (born 1946), American film director
Bryan Robinson (disambiguation), multiple people
Cam Robinson (born 1995), American football player
Carl Robinson (born 1976), Welsh football player
Cecilia Robinson (cricketer) (1924–2021), English cricketer
Cedric Robinson (1940–2016), American author and professor of Black Studies
Cedric Robinson (guide) (1933-2021), British guide to Morecambe Bay Sands, England
Charles Gepp Robinson (1805-1875), Royal Navy Officer and hydrographic surveyor
Charles M. Robinson III, American author and illustrator
Charles Mulford Robinson (1869–1917), American city planner and journalist
Charles W. Robinson (1919–2014), American business person and entrepreneur
Chris Robinson (actor) (born 1938), American film and television actor
Chuckie Robinson (born 1994), American baseball player
Claire Robinson (born c. 1978), American cook and television host
Claude C. Robinson (1881–1976), Canadian ice hockey and sports executive
Claude E. Robinson (1900–1961), American pioneer in advertising and public opinion research
Craig Robinson (actor) (born 1971), American actor and comedian
Craig Robinson (basketball) (born 1962), American college basketball coach
Curtis Robinson (born 1998), American football player
Cynthia Robinson (1944–2015), American trumpeter
David Robinson (disambiguation), multiple people
Denard Robinson (born 1990), American football player
Derek Robinson (disambiguation), multiple people
Dollie Lowther Robinson (died 1983), American politician and labor rights worker
Dominique Robinson (born 1998), American football player
Douglas Robinson (disambiguation), multiple people
Duncan Robinson (art historian) (1943–2022), British art historian, Master of Magdalene College, Cambridge
Duncan Robinson (basketball) (born 1994), American basketball player
Dunta Robinson (born 1982), American NFL cornerback, playing for the Houston Texans

E–I
Earl Robinson (1910–1991), American singer-songwriter, father of Perry Robinson
Eddie Robinson (American football coach) (1919–2007), American college football coach
Edmond Robinson (born 1992), American football player
Edward Robinson (scholar), American biblical scholar
Edward G. Robinson (1893–1973), Romanian-American actor
Edward N. Robinson (1873–1945), American college football coach
Edwin Arlington Robinson (1869–1935), American poet
Effie Robinson (1920-2003), American social worker and public housing director
Eleanor Robinson (swimmer) (born 2001), British para-swimmer and Paralympic gold medalist
Elisha Smith Robinson (1817–1885), British paper and packaging manufacturer
Elzadie Robinson (1897–1975), American classic female blues singer and songwriter
Emily Robinson (born 1998), American actress
Eric Robinson (disambiguation), multiple people
Ezekiel Robinson (1815–1894), American Baptist clergyman
Fiona Robinson (born 1969), Australian basketball and handball player
Floyd Robinson (singer) (1932–2016), American country singer
Foster Robinson (1880–1957), British cricketer and businessman
Frank Robinson (disambiguation), multiple people
Frederick John Robinson, 1st Viscount Goderich (1782–1859), British statesman and prime minister
Gene Robinson (born 1947), American, bishop of the Episcopal diocese of New Hampshire
George Robinson (disambiguation), multiple people
Georgia Ann Robinson (1879–1961), American law enforcement officer and activist
Gerald Robinson (1938–2014), American priest, convicted of the murder of Margaret Ann Pahl
Gerald Robinson (American football) (born 1963), American football player
Gerald Robinson (basketball, born 1984), American basketball player
Gerald Robinson (basketball, born 1989), American basketball player
Sir Gerry Robinson (1948–2021), Irish-born British businessman
Gertrude Maud Robinson, British organic chemist
Gil Robinson, American football player
Gilbert de Beauregard Robinson (1906–1992), Canadian mathematician
Gilbert Robinson, British rugby league footballer of the 1930s for Great Britain, Wakefield Trinity, and Castleford
Glenn Robinson (born 1973), American basketball player
Glenn Robinson III (born 1994), son of the above, also a basketball player
Greg Robinson (American football coach), American football coach
Greg Robinson (running back), American football running back
Greg Robinson (offensive tackle), American football offensive tackle
Harvey Leigh Robinson (1908–1979), American football player and coach
Harvey Miguel Robinson (born 1974), American serial killer and rapist
Hannah Robinson, British songwriter
Helen Ring Robinson (1878–1923), second woman to serve as a state senator in the United States
Henry Robinson (disambiguation), multiple people
Herbert Christopher Robinson (1874–1929), British zoologist and ornithologist
Hercules Robinson, 1st Baron Rosmead (1824–1897), British colonial administrator, Governor of Hong Kong
Hervey Robinson (1874–1954), English professional footballer
Ian Robinson (cricket umpire) (1947–2016), Zimbabwean cricket umpire
Iris Robinson (born 1949), Northern Irish politician
Isaac Robinson (disambiguation), multiple people

J–M
Jack Robinson (disambiguation), multiple people
Jackie Robinson (disambiguation), multiple people
Jamal Robinson (American football) (born 1993), American football player
James Robinson (disambiguation), multiple people, including Jim and Jamie Robinson
Jammie Robinson (born 2001), American football player
Janarius Robinson (born 1998), American football player
Jane Robinson (disambiguation), multiple people
Jason Robinson (disambiguation), multiple people
Jennifer Robinson (disambiguation), multiple people
Jerry Robinson (disambiguation), multiple people
Joan Robinson (1903–1983), British economist
John Robinson (disambiguation), multiple people
Joseph Robinson (disambiguation), multiple people
Joyce Robinson (1925–2013), Jamaican public servant
Julia Robinson (née Bowman, 1919–1985), American mathematician, first female president of the AMS
Julian Robinson, Jamaican politician
Karen Robinson (born 1968), British-Canadian actress
Keith Robinson (disambiguation), multiple people
Ken Robinson (disambiguation), multiple people
Khalid Robinson (born 1998), American singer and songwriter known professionally as Khalid
Khiry Robinson (born 1989), American football player
Kim Stanley Robinson (born 1952), American science fiction writer
Larry Robinson (born 1951), Canadian ice hockey player
Leora Bettison Robinson (1840-1914), American author, educator
Lionel Robinson (1866–1922), principal of Clark & Robinson, Australian stockbrokers and racehorse owners
Lionel Keir Robinson (1897–1983), British antiquarian bookseller
Lucius Robinson (1810–1891), New York Governor 1877–1879
Lucy Robinson (actress), British actress
Luke Robinson (disambiguation), multiple people
Luther Robinson (born 1991), American football player
Maria D. Robinson (1840–1920), British-Irish artist
 Marc Robinson (born 1964), Indian actor and model
 Marc Robinson (politician) (born 1953), Australian politician in the Australian Capital Territory
Mark Robinson (disambiguation), multiple people
Mary Robinson (disambiguation), multiple people
Marilynne Robinson (born 1947), American writer
Matthew Robinson (disambiguation), multiple people
Michael Robinson (disambiguation), multiple people
Michelle Robinson (Michelle Obama, born 1964), American lawyer and First Lady of the United States
Mitch Robinson (born 1989), Australian rules footballer
Morgana Robinson (born 1982), British comedian
Morris Robinson (born 1969), American operatic bass
Moses Robinson (1741–1813), American statesman, governor of the Vermont Republic (1789–1790), one of the first two United States senators from the state of Vermont (1791–1796)
Moushaumi Robinson (born 1981), American track and field sprinter
Muriel Robinson (born 1954), British academic administrator and education scholar

N–Z
Nate Robinson (disambiguation), multiple people
Nathan Robinson, multiple people 
Neville Robinson (1925–1996), British physicist
Nick Robinson (American actor) (born 1995), American actor
Norm Robinson, Australian rugby league footballer and coach
Orlando Robinson (born 2000), American basketball player
Patricia Robinson, Trinidadian economist
Paul Robinson, multiple people
Perry Robinson (1938–2018), American jazz clarinetist and composer, son of Earl Robinson
Peter Robinson, multiple people
Phoebe Robinson, American comedian, writer, and actress
Piers Robinson, British writer and former academic 
Porter Robinson, American electronic musician
Rachel Robinson (born 1922), American, widow of Jackie Robinson and founder of the Jackie Robinson Foundation
Raphael M. Robinson (1911–1995), American mathematician
Ray Charles Robinson (1930–2004), American pianist commonly known as Ray Charles
Reggie Robinson (born 1997), American football player
Richard Robinson, multiple people
Rix Robinson (1789–1875), American politician
Robert Robinson (disambiguation), multiple people
Rodney Robinson (born 1978), American educator
Rod Robinson (born 1976), American football player
Roger Robinson (poet), British/Trinidadian writer, musician and performer 
Romona Robinson (born 1959), American television news anchor
Ronald Robinson (1920–1999), British historian of Africa
Ryan Robinson, multiple people
Samuel Robinson, multiple people
Samuel Robinson, alias of South American philosopher and educator Simón Rodríguez (1769–1854)
Seamus Robinson (fencer) (born 1975), Australian fencer
Séumas Robinson (Irish republican) (1890–1961), Irish Republican
Shawna Robinson (born 1964), American female NASCAR driver
Sidney Robinson, multiple people
Sozhasingarayer Robinson (born 1980), Basketball player for India's national team
Smokey Robinson (born 1940), African-American R&B and soul singer and songwriter
Spider Robinson (born 1948), American science fiction writer
Stanley Robinson, multiple people
Steve Robinson, multiple people, includes Stephen Robinson
Sugar Ray Robinson (Walker Smith Jr., 1921–1989), American boxer
The Swiss Family Robinson, characters in eponymous books and films
T. Robinson (fl. 1990s), Bermudian cricketer
Thomas Robinson, multiple people
Tim Robinson, multiple people
Todd D. Robinson (born 1963), American diplomat and ambassador
Tony Robinson (born 1946), British television comedy actor and political campaigner
Trayvon Robinson (born 1987), American baseball player
Trent Robinson (born 1977), Australian Rugby League coach for the Sydney Roosters
Tyree Robinson (born 1994), American football player
V'Alonee Robinson (born 1992), Bahamian sprinter
V. Gilpin Robinson (1851–1942), American politician
Vicki Sue Robinson (1954–2000), American singer and actress
Wan'Dale Robinson (born 2001), American football player
W. Andrew Robinson (born 1957), British author and editor
W. Heath Robinson (William Heath Robinson, 1872–1944), British cartoonist and illustrator
William Robinson, multiple people
Winifred Josephine Robinson (1867–1962), American botanist
Zeno Robinson, American voice actor

See also
 Mr. Robinson (disambiguation), multiple people
 Robertson (surname)
 Robeson (disambiguation), multiple people
 Robin (name)
 Robinson (disambiguation), multiple people
 Robison (disambiguation), multiple people

References

English-language surnames
Scottish surnames
Masculine given names
Surnames of English origin
Patronymic surnames
Surnames from given names